Kiryat Netafim (lit. Village of Drips) is an Israeli settlement in the northern West Bank. Located about 8 km south of the Palestinian village of Salfit, it is organised as a community settlement and falls under the jurisdiction of Shomron Regional Council.

The international community considers Israeli settlements in the West Bank illegal under international law, but the Israeli government disputes this.

History
Kiryat Netafim was founded in June 1986, on land belonging to the   Palestinian  villages of Qarawat Bani Hassan,  and  Haris,  by a group of Orthodox Yemenite Jews as another link in a chain of settlements built along the Trans-Samaria Highway and adjacent to the Barkan Industrial Park. It is named after a Bible verse: "New wine will drip from the mountains." (Amos 9:13) Since then, Kiryat Netafim has lost its homogeneous nature while accepting families from many different backgrounds.

In 2009 Peace Now petitioned the Israeli High Court, and laid a complaint against the then Defence Minister Ehud Barak, to order the demolition of 14 illegal structures built without authorization on public and private Palestinian land. The Defence ministry replied given approval to construction plans that would legalize the 14 structures. An interim injunction from the High Court on October 1 prohibited construction until the legal issues were settled. A further request was made on December 29 to find the settlers guilty of contempt for breaching the injunction to stop building. The state admitted the fact but requested the breach be ignored because the state had limited resources to regulate settlements and different priorities.

In November 2014 Netafim began bulldozing and clearing further  Qarawat Bani Hassan territory, under the protecting of IDF troops, in a measure apparently designed to extend the settlement.

The community is located in the vicinity of several archaeological sites.

Education
The settlement has two kindergartens and one nursery.

References

Religious Israeli settlements
Populated places established in 1984
1984 establishments in the Palestinian territories
Yemeni-Jewish culture in Israel
Israeli settlements in the West Bank